Undan för undan is a 1990 studio album by Freda'. For the album, the band was awarded a Grammis award in the "Rock group of the year" category.

Track listing 

Lyrics and music: Uno Svenningsson & Arne Johansson.

 Undan för undan
 Allt man kan önska sig
 Undrar vem du är
 Överallt
 Erika
 Triumfens ögonblick
 Det saknas lite värme
 Jag är på väg
 Kom kom
 Kan inte se dig här

Contributors (Freda') 
Uno Svenningsson - vocals and guitar
Arne Johansson - guitars, keyboard and omnichord
Mats Johansson - drums and percussion

Other musicians 
Sam Johansson - keyboard
Johan Vävare - moog, keyboard
Mats "Limbo" Lindberg - warwickbass
Lasse Danielsson - bass (2, 3)
Niklas Medin - organ, piano (2, 7)
Ulf, Leif, Mats - wind instrument (7)

Charts

References 

1990 albums
Freda' albums
Swedish-language albums